Óttar Halldór Sveinsson (born 14 October 1958) is an Icelandic author and former journalist. He is best know for his book series Útkall where he documents search and rescue missions in Iceland. His first book, Útkall Alfa TF-SIF, about several rescue missions involving the Icelandic Coast Guard helicopter Sif (TF-SIF), came out in 1995. As of 2022, he has written 29 books.

References

1958 births
Living people
Icelandic journalists
Icelandic writers